Pithom (Ancient Greek:   or  , and  ) was an ancient city of Egypt. References in the Hebrew Bible and ancient Greek and Roman, sources exist for this city, but its exact location remains somewhat uncertain. A number of scholars identified it as the later archaeological site of Tell el-Maskhuta. Others identified it as the earlier archaeological site of Tell El Retabeh.

The name

This name comes from Hebrew   which was taken from the Late Egyptian name  (from earlier ) "House of Atum".

Biblical Pithom

Pithom is one of the cities which, according to Exodus , was built for the Pharaoh of the oppression by the forced labor of the Israelites. The other city was Ramses; and the Septuagint adds a third, "On, which is Heliopolis." These cities are called by a Hebrew term rendered  in the Authorized Version "treasure cities" and in the Revised Version "store cities." The Septuagint renders it  "strong [or "fortified"] cities." The same term is used of certain cities of King Solomon in I Kings 9:19 (comp. also II Chronicles 16:4).

Graeco-Roman Heroöpolis

Heroöpolis was a large city east of the Nile Delta, situated near the mouth of the Royal Canal which connected the Nile with the Red Sea. Although not immediately upon the coast, but nearly due north of the Bitter Lakes, Heroöpolis was of sufficient importance, as a trading station, to confer its name upon the arm of the Red Sea which runs up the Egyptian mainland as far as Arsinoë (near modern Suez) -- the modern Gulf of Suez.  It was the capital of the 8th nome of Lower Egypt.

Location
Early on, the location of Pithom—just like the locations of other similar sites, such as Tanis—had been the subject of much conjecture and debate.

Édouard Naville and Flinders Petrie were looking for Pithom along the Wadi Tumilat, an arable strip of land serving as the ancient transit route between Egypt and Canaan across the Sinai—the biblical 'Way of Shur'. In the spring of 1883, Naville believed he had identified Pithom as the archaeological site Tell El Maskhuta. The site of Pithom, as identified by Naville, is at the eastern edge of Wadi Tumilat, south-west of Ismaïlia. Petrie agreed with this identification. John S. Holladay Jr., a more recent investigator of the site, also supports this opinion.

Tell El Retaba
Eight miles west from Tell El Maskhuta is the site of Tell El Retabeh. This is approximately the midpoint of Wadi Tumilat.

Here was found a group of granite statues representing Ramesses II, two inscriptions naming Pr-Itm (Temple of Atum), storehouses and bricks made without straw. So archeologists (maybe wrongly) concluded that this was the site of Pi-Ramesses. The excavations carried on by Naville for the Egypt Exploration Fund uncovered a city wall, a ruined temple, and the remains of a series of brick buildings with very thick walls and consisting of rectangular chambers of various sizes, opening only at the top and without any entrances to one another.

Some scholars, such as Manfred Bietak and Kenneth Kitchen, have argued that this was the ancient Pithom. This opinion goes back to the 19th century, when Alan Gardiner first identified Pithom with the site of Tell El Retaba, and this was later accepted by William F. Albright, and Kenneth Kitchen. However, John van Seters and Neil Asher Silberman argue that Tell El Retaba was unoccupied during the period when we find monuments relating to a town called Pithom.

Naville identified all these locations as being in the region of Tjeku (Sukkot), the 8th Lower Egypt nome.

The joint Polish-Slovak expedition has carried out a systematic research at Tell El Retaba since 2007. It is conducted with the cooperation of several institutions: Institute of Archaeology University of Warsaw, the Polish Centre of Mediterranean Archaeology University of Warsaw, the Slovak Academy of Sciences and the Aigyptos Foundation.

More recent analyses have demonstrated that the designation for the temple of Atum, pr-itm, can be found in inscriptions at both sites—both at Tell El Retaba and at Tell El Maskhuta. This seems to demonstrate that the name 'Pithom' was used originally for the earlier site, Tell El Retaba, before it was abandoned. And when the newer city of Tel El Maskhuta was built, the same name was applied to it as well – as the temple of Atum was moved to El Maskhuta. Thus, in effect, 'Pithom' was moved to a new location, which phenomenon is attested with some other cities as well, such as Migdol.

Wadi Tumilat Project - Tell El Maskhuta
Modern excavations at Tel El Maskhuta were carried out by the University of Toronto 'Wadi Tumilat Project' under the direction of John S. Holladay Jr. They worked over five seasons between 1978 and 1985. These excavations have shown that the history of Tel El Maskhuta is quite complex. There was a Middle Bronze IIB settlement there (18th-17th centuries BC), associated with the Hyksos, followed by a long break until the late 7th century BC, when there was rebuilding.

This construction at the end of the 7th century may have been carried out by Pharaoh Necho II, possibly as part of his uncompleted canal building project from the Nile to the Gulf of Suez.

See also
List of ancient Egyptian towns and cities
List of ancient Egyptian sites, including sites of temples

References

 Sarna, Nahum M. “Exploring Exodus: The Oppression,” Biblical Archaeologist, Volume 49: 1986 (2001 electronic ed.)
 M.I. Bakr and H. Brandl, "Various Sites in the Eastern Nile Delta: Tell el-Maskhuta", in: M.I. Bakr and H. Brandl, with F. Kalloniatis (eds.), Egyptian Antiquities from the Eastern Nile Delta (= Museums in the Nile Delta, vol. 2). Cairo/Berlin 2014, pp. 78 and 266-267, cat. 72. .

Archaeological sites in Egypt
Ruins in Egypt
Torah cities
Former populated places in Egypt
Tell el-Maskhuta
Wadi Tumilat